Gura Padinii is a commune in Olt County, Oltenia, Romania. It is composed of two villages, Gura Padinii and Satu Nou. These were part of Orlea Commune until 2004, when they were split off.

References

Communes in Olt County
Localities in Oltenia